Auri Parish is an administrative unit of Dobele Municipality, Latvia.

Towns, villages and settlements of Auri Parish 
Gardene
Ķirpēni
Auri
Liepziedi
Lielbērze
Bērzkrasti
Rūpnieki

References 

Dobele Municipality
Parishes of Latvia